Archibald Murray
 Archibald Murray (fencer)
 Sir Archibald Murray, 3rd Baronet
 Archibald R. Murray